Asimilobine is an inhibitor of dopamine biosynthesis, and a serotonergic receptor antagonist.

References

 
 

Aporphine alkaloids
Dibenzoquinolines